Cratilla metallica is a species of dragonflies in the family Libellulidae.

References

Libellulidae